President of the Republic of South Africa and Others v M & G Media Ltd is an important case in South African administrative law. It concerned a report by two senior judges who were asked by the President of the Republic to visit Zimbabwe shortly before its presidential election in 2002. "Surprisingly," instead of confirming an order to release the report, a majority of the Constitutional Court resorted to section 80 of the Promotion of Access to Information Act (PAIA) and remitted the matter to the High Court for it to examine the report in secret and make a determination.

References 
President of the Republic of South Africa and Others v M & G Media Limited 2012 (2) SA 50 (CC), on appeal from 2011 (2) SA 1 (SCA); [2011] 3 All SA 56 (SCA); 2011 (4) BCLR 363 (SCA)
 C. Hoexter Administrative Law in South Africa 2 ed (2012).

Notes 

2011 in South African law
2011 in case law
Constitutional Court of South Africa cases